Slobodan Šijan (born November 16, 1946) is a Serbian film director.

Biography
Šijan was born in Belgrade, Yugoslavia. He graduated from the Fine Arts Academy in Belgrade, and then enrolled in Belgrade's Academy of Theater Faculty of Dramatic Arts in 1970. He directed a number of television films as well as experimental and short films during the 1970s. From 1976 to 1979, he published a series of fanzines which according to him were made "out of frustration" in between his experimentation and attempts to break into professional cinema.

His first full-length feature Ko to tamo peva, directed in collaboration with writer Dušan Kovačević and cinematographer Božidar Nikolić, was released in 1980 and became a box-office hit. 1982's Maratonci trče počasni krug, also achieved considerable commercial success.

Over the coming years Šijan directed two more notable films - Kako sam sistematski uništen od idiota and Davitelj protiv davitelja.

Filmography

TV work
 Gradilište (1979) (TV)
 Ing. ugostiteljstva (1979) (short)
 Kost od mamuta (1979) (TV)
 Najlepša soba (1978) (TV)
 Šta se dogodilo sa Filipom Preradovićem (1977) (TV movie)
 Pohvala svetu (1976) (TV short)
 Sve što je bilo lepo (1976) (TV movie)
 Sunce te čuva (1975) (TV short)

References

External links
 

Serbian film directors
1946 births
Living people
Film people from Belgrade